Locomotives of the Caledonian Railway. The Caledonian Railway Locomotive Works were originally at Greenock but moved to St. Rollox, Glasgow, in 1856. The locomotive classes are listed under the names of the railway's Chief Mechanical Engineers.

Locomotives
The class number used for Caledonian Railway engines was the stock number of the first member of the class to reach traffic. Hence earlier numbered classes could well have appeared later in time.

Until the appointment of Dugald Drummond, unlike most other British railways, almost all engines had outside cylinders, and the 0-6-0 arrangement was quite rare, goods engines being of type 2-4-0 or 0-4-2. Passenger engines were normally 2-2-2.

Robert Sinclair 1847-1856

Benjamin Conner 1856-1876

George Brittain 1876-1882

Dugald Drummond 1882-1890

Hugh Smellie 1890
Appointed 1 September 1890. Died 19 April 1891.

John Lambie 1891-1895
Unless otherwise stated these were all built at the Caledonian Railway's St. Rollox railway works

John F. McIntosh 1895-1914
Unless otherwise stated these were all built at the Caledonian Railway's St. Rollox railway works

William Pickersgill 1914-1923

London, Midland and Scottish Railway

Caledonian Railway locomotives still existing in 1923 were taken into the stock of the London, Midland and Scottish Railway (LMS). The LMS built some locomotives to Caledonian Railway designs after 1923.

Preservation
Only three Caledonian Railway locomotives survive.
Single No. 123
439 Class 419
812 Class 828

See also
 List of LMS locomotives as of 31 December 1947

Sources
 Baxter, B., (1984) British Locomotive Catalogue 1825–1923 Vol.4, Moorland Publishing
 Haresnape, B. & Rowledge, P. (1982) Drummond Locomotives, a Pictorial History, Ian Allan

References

Caledonian Railway

Caledonian Railway